Lies and Lullabies is a Rod Hardy-directed 1993 ABC television movie about a pregnant cocaine addict, played by Susan Dey.  The film was released on DVD as Sad Inheritance in 2005 and is also sometimes known as Love, Lies and Lullabies.

Plot
Christina is the adult daughter of an alcoholic. A habitual cocaine user, she continues to abuse the drug after she becomes pregnant by her boyfriend. When the baby is born addicted, she is kept away from Christina based on the recommendation of a social worker, who deems her an unfit mother. Christina, distraught, battles to end her addiction and regain custody of her baby.

History
The script for Lies and Lullabies initially cast Dey as the sister of a closet-cocaine addict who dies during childbirth. Dey's character was then charged with raising the baby, ignorant to the developmental delays that would follow. However, after visiting a treatment facility and meeting mothers who were in the process of seeking treatment to regain custody of their children, Dey (who also acted as the producer of the film), asked that the script be rewritten. Speaking to The Post and Courier, she stated that early in the production, "we all had very little compassion for these women," but that after meeting them they learned "the reality is that these women can be helped and if given a chance for treatment and a choice between drugs and their children, many choose their children."

Cast
 Susan Dey as Christina Kinsey 
 Lorraine Toussaint as Florence Crawford 
 D.W. Moffett as Gabriel 
 Piper Laurie as Margaret Kinsey 
 Lisa Rieffel as Rachel
 Kathleen York as Terry 
 Guy Boyd as Walter 
 Andy Romano as Judge Windt 
 Lawrence Monoson as Christopher Bentlage   
 Allyce Beasley as Cindy 
 A.J. Johnson as Grandpa Simmington
 Tim Kelleher as Duke Gibson-Lampiassi    
 Neal Lerner as Victor 
 Sondra Blake as Mrs. Sweetser 
 Brandon Hammond as Kenny
 María Díaz as Sandra 
 Yvette Cruise as Sadie 
 Ashley Gardner as Fran 
 Mary Anne McGarry as Pediatrician 
 Paul Perri as Dr. Boardman 
 Liz Vassey as Chloe 
 Gigi Bermingham as Kim 
 Perla Walter as Sadie's Mother 
 Jeanne Mori as Nurse 
 Carrie Stauber as Nurse 
 Brandon Hammond as Kenny 
 Jennifer Gertsman as Nurse 
 Ace Mask as Clerk 
 Bernardo Rosa Jr. as Sadie's Husband 
 Ericka Bryce as Party Girl
 Amber Adelmann as Orphan girl

References

External links

1993 films
1993 television films
1993 drama films
ABC Movie of the Week
Films about drugs
American docudrama films
American films based on actual events
Films shot in California
Films directed by Rod Hardy
American drama television films
1990s American films